The 1968 Brown Bears football team was an American football team that represented Brown University during the 1968 NCAA University Division football season. Brown finished last in the Ivy League. 

In their second season under head coach Len Jardine, the Bears compiled a 2–7 record and were outscored 286 to 97. J. Rallis was the team captain. 

The Bears' winless (0–7) conference record placed last in the Ivy League standings. They were outscored by Ivy opponents 258 to 60. 

Brown played its home games at Brown Stadium in Providence, Rhode Island.

Schedule

References

Brown
Brown Bears football seasons
Brown Bears football